"What hath God wrought" is a translation of a phrase from the Book of Numbers (Numbers 23:23), and may refer to:

"What hath God wrought", the official first Morse code message transmitted in the US on May 24, 1844, to officially open the Baltimore–Washington telegraph line 
What Hath God Wrought? The History of the Salvation Army in Canada, a 1952 book by Arnold Brown
What Hath God Wrought: The Transformation of America, 1815–1848, a Pulitzer Prize-winning 2007 book by Daniel Walker Howe